Eitan Gorlin (born 1969 in Washington, D.C.) is a filmmaker, author and actor.  He is known for his portrayal of Martin Eisenstadt, a satirical depiction of a McCain campaign adviser.  Even though Eisenstadt was said to be part of the "Harding Institute for Freedom and Democracy", named for one of the United States' less beloved presidents, he was quoted by several national news sources, who failed to document his existence.

In 2009, he co-authored the satirical novel "I Am Martin Eisenstadt: One Man's (Wildly Inappropriate) Adventures with the Last Republicans".

Filmography
 The Jerusalem Syndrome (1999) 
 Sometime in August (1999) Producer 
 The Holy Land (2001) writer/director 
 "Sheldon"  (2007) co-writer, co-director and lead role 
 "The Last Republican" (2008) co-writer, co-director and lead role  
 Bayou Caviar (2018) co-writer

Honors and awards
 2002 Grand Jury Prize, Slamdance Film Festival for The Holy Land

References

1969 births
Living people
American filmmakers
University of Pennsylvania alumni
The New School alumni
People from Washington, D.C.